Shui is the Mandarin pinyin and Wade–Giles romanization of the Chinese surname written  in Chinese character. It is listed 38th in the Song dynasty classic text Hundred Family Surnames. Shui is not among the 300 most common surnames in China. It is the 38th name on the Hundred Family Surnames poem.

Notable people
 Shui Hua (1916–1995), film director
 Shui Junshao (水鈞韶; 1878–1961), Republic of China diplomat
 Shui Junyi (水均益; born 1963), journalist and television presenter, grandson of Shui Zi
 Shui Qingxia (水庆霞, born 1966), member of the Chinese women's football team, Olympic silver medalist
 Shui Zi (水梓; 1884–1973), educator and politician

References

Chinese-language surnames
Individual Chinese surnames